Al-Fatah Sport Club, is an Iraqi football team based in Al-Rusafa, Baghdad, that plays in the Iraq Division Three.

Managerial history
 Thabit Gatie
 Sabah Jomah
 Mahmoud Shaker 
 Riyadh Kamil

See also
 2021–22 Iraq Division Three

References

External links
 Al-Fatah SC on Goalzz.com
 Iraq Clubs- Foundation Dates

2018 establishments in Iraq
Association football clubs established in 2018
Football clubs in Baghdad